Anna Mega Komnene (Modern Greek: Άννα Μεγάλη Κομνηνή, transliterated: Anna Megalē Komnēnē, known also as Anna Hatun, ; 1447 - after 1463), was a Byzantine princess and daughter of the last Emperor of Trebizond, David II and his wife Helena Kantakouzene.

She became one of the consorts of Ottoman Sultan Mehmed II the Conqueror.

Biography 
Her father offered her as a wife to Sultan Mehmed II when he captured Constantinople in 1453, but he refused. However, in 1461, after Mehmed conquered Trebizond, he decided to add Anna to his harem. However, it is improbable that the union was ever consummated: for several generations already, the Ottoman dynasty no longer fathered children with foreign noblewomen, to avoid external interference in the succession.

In 1463, Mehmed executed David, three of his sons and his nephew Alexius (son of Alexander of Trebizond and Maria Gattilusio, who later became a consort of Mehmed II) on charges of communicating with the Sultan's enemies Uzun Hasan and his wife Despina Khatun (David's niece as daughter of John IV of Trabzon). Later, Gevherhan Hatun (Mehmed II's daughter) married Ughurlu Muhammad (Uzun Hasan's son). Their son, Ahmad Beg, married Aynişah Sultan (Bayezid II's daughter and Mehmed II's granddaughter) and they had two daughters and a son.  

Anna was suspected of having facilitated the exchange of letters, but in the end she suffered no consequences. 

In the same year, however, Mehmed married her to his vizier, Zagan Pasha, who had previously been married to his sister Fatma Hatun. In return, Mehmed married Hatice Hatun, one of Zagan's daughters by his first wife, Sitti Nefise Hatun.

Anna's fate is not certain. According to some sources, Anna was killed by her husband because she did not want to convert, while according to others, she remarried Elvanbeyzade Sinan Bey after becoming widowed or divorced.

Her date of death is unknown, along with her place of burial.

References

Sources 

 
 

1447 births
15th-century Byzantine women
Kantakouzenos family
Palaiologos dynasty
15th-century consorts of Ottoman sultans
Mehmed the Conqueror